Jeffrey Howard Cirillo (born September 23, 1969) is an American former third baseman in Major League Baseball. In a 14-season career, Cirillo was a .296 hitter with 112 home runs and 727 RBI in 1617 games. He shares the major league record of playing 99 consecutive errorless games at third base with John Wehner. He batted and threw right-handed.

Early life
Cirillo was born in Pasadena, California, to Howard Cirillo and Carol Grant. He has one step-brother, Adam Grant, who played baseball at UCSB. Cirillo attended Providence High School where he excelled in both baseball and basketball. Then, he enrolled at the University of Southern California after receiving little attention from colleges in his high school years. As a Trojan, he started out as a pitcher; however, he was moved to third base later in his college career. He was a member of the Phi Kappa Psi fraternity there and graduated with a degree in Communications.

Professional career
Cirillo was drafted in the 11th Round by the Milwaukee Brewers. The same year, he added 198 hits (also a career-high) with 15 home runs and 88 RBI. His most productive season came in 2000 with the Colorado Rockies, when he posted career-highs in RBI (115), runs (111), and doubles (53); finished with 195 hits; and matched his personal-best .326 average.

On December 16, 2001, the Rockies traded Cirillo to the Seattle Mariners for Denny Stark, Brian Fuentes, and José Paniagua. Posting the lowest BABIP since his rookie season, he was ineffective with the bat but provided strong defensive contributions while in Seattle, ranked by UZR as the second best third baseman in the American League in 2002. In 2003, he continued to provide above average defense but again posted the lowest BABIP of his career (.226 compared to a .320 career average).

Cirillo was traded to the San Diego Padres before the  season but was inactive most of the year with a wrist injury. He made history by becoming Randy Johnson's 4,000th strikeout victim on June 29, 2004.

Cirillo signed a one-year contract with the Minnesota Twins in December . He did not finish the season with the Twins and was claimed off waivers by the Arizona Diamondbacks on August 3, . Cirillo stated that he would most certainly retire at the end of the 2007 season. He made the first pitching appearance of his career on August 20, 2007, against Milwaukee. He pitched one inning and gave up two walks and no runs while striking out one player, former Diamondback Craig Counsell. "He's way nastier than I thought he would be," said Bill Hall, who worked one of the walks. "I was shocked when I got up there. He's got a knuckleball, a slider, he was throwing some changeups. Those pitches make 84, 83 [mph fastballs] look pretty hard. I heard he was a better pitcher in college than he was a hitter."

Before the 2007 NLDS, Cirillo held one of baseball's most unwanted records. He had played in 1,617 regular season games but never in the postseason. When his team made the playoffs, the title was passed to Damion Easley of the New York Mets who finished the 2008 season having played 1,706 straight games without a playoff berth.

Post-playing days
On April 2, 2008, it was announced that Cirillo would join FSN Wisconsin as an analyst for Milwaukee Brewers broadcasts. His first appearance was on April 18, 2008. He worked as a pre/post-game show for two years in 2008 and 2011.

Cirillo has worked as a part-time scout with the Arizona Diamondbacks (2009 and 2010). Cirillo was hired by the Los Angeles Angels of Anaheim in 2012 as a scout.

Cirillo is a partner in Pacific Baseball Ventures, LLC, which owns the Walla Walla Sweets and the Yakima Valley Pippins. Both teams play in the West Coast League, a summer collegiate wood-bat league located in Walla Walla, Washington.

Cirillo is also an assistant baseball coach for the Bellevue High School baseball team, where he coaches his sons Cole (class of 2016), Carson (class of 2018), and Connor (class of 2019).

Personal life
Cirillo has three sons with his ex-wife Nancy: Cole (born 1997), Carson (born 1999), and Connor (born 2001). The Cirillo family lived in Whitefish Bay, Wisconsin, during Jeff's time on the Milwaukee Brewers. His son, Cole, played football and basketball, as well as participating in track and field events, at Bellevue High School before graduating in 2016. He graduated Magna Cum Laude from the University of Southern California in 2020 and is currently a Management Consulting Associate at KPMG. Carson, a 2018 graduate, played varsity baseball and golf at Bellevue High School, now attending the University of Puget Sound, and Connor, who played basketball and baseball, graduated in 2019 with the intention of attending the University of Southern California as well.

See also
 List of Colorado Rockies team records

References

External links

1969 births
Living people
American League All-Stars
Arizona Diamondbacks players
Arizona Diamondbacks scouts
Arizona League Mariners players
Baseball players from California
Beloit Brewers players
Colorado Rockies players
Colorado Springs Sky Sox players
El Paso Diablos players
Fort Myers Miracle players
Helena Brewers players
Inland Empire 66ers of San Bernardino players
Los Angeles Angels scouts
Los Angeles Angels of Anaheim scouts
Major League Baseball third basemen
Milwaukee Brewers players
Minnesota Twins players
Nashville Sounds players
National League All-Stars
New Orleans Zephyrs players
Sportspeople from Redmond, Washington
Petroleros de Cabimas players
Portland Beavers players
San Diego Padres players
Seattle Mariners players
Stockton Ports players
Tacoma Rainiers players
USC Trojans baseball players
People from Medina, Washington
American expatriate baseball players in Venezuela
Peninsula Oilers players